Yirrmal Marika (born 1993), known mononymously Yirrmal, is an Indigenous Australian vocalist. A Yolngu man, his music features traditional sounds and elements of Yolŋu music.

Early life
Yirrmal Marika was born in 1993 in Yirrkala in the Rirratjingu clan and began learning music at age 11.

Personal life
Yirrmal's father Witiyana Marika was a singer and dancer in Yothu Yindi and is related to Dr Gurrumul Yunupingu on his mother's side. Yirrmal cites his grandfather and former lead singer of Yothu Yindi, Dr Yunupingu as his biggest influence saying "He was my inspiration since I was a kid. He did great things for all Australians. There are a lot of other Indigenous people that I look up to also – people such as Archie Roach, Gurrumul, Saltwater Band, Dan Sultan, Jessica Mauboy and Rrawun Maymuru. I see what they have done for their people."

Yirrmal moved to Geelong, Victoria in 2011.

Career
In 2013, Yirrmal released his debut single "Deep Blue Sea". He performed the song at numerous events including Australasian Worldwide Music Expo as a solo artist and as Yirrmal & The Yolngu Boys.

In November 2016, Yirrmal released his debut EP Youngblood, telling the ABC Radio "We're living in two worlds, learning in two worlds, carrying a message, a sharing of culture".
Melissa Davis from Forte Magazine gave the EP 5 out of 5 saying "His rich voice combined with his lyrics tells the stories of dreams, the issues in society and his culture – a unique insight." ABC Radio called it "deeply affecting and joyously celebrating his upbringing and place in the world."

In 2017, Yirrmal featured on Baker Boy's "Marryuna". The song ranked at number 17 in Triple J's Hottest 100 of 2017. At the Music Victoria Awards of 2018 "Marryuna" won Best Song. and at the National Indigenous Music Awards 2018, the video won Film Clip of the Year.

In August 2022, Yirrmal released "Promised Land", featuring Dami Im. The song was produced by Andrew Farriss, and is expected to be taken off Yirrmal's self-titled debut album, scheduled to be released later in the year.

Discography

Extended plays

Singles

As lead artist

As featured artist

Guest appearances

Awards and nominations

AIR Awards
The Australian Independent Record Awards (known informally as the AIR Awards) is an annual awards night to recognise, promote and celebrate the success of Australia's Independent Music sector.

! 
|-
| 2018
| "Marryuna" (with Baker Boy)
| Best Independent Single or EP
| 
| 
|}

APRA Awards
The APRA Awards are held in Australia and New Zealand by the Australasian Performing Right Association to recognise songwriting skills, sales and airplay performance by its members annually.

! 
|-
| scope="row"| 2019
| "Marryuna" (with Baker Boy)
| Urban Work of the Year
| 
| 
|}

National Indigenous Music Awards
The National Indigenous Music Awards (NIMAs) recognise excellence, dedication, innovation and outstanding contribution to the Northern Territory music industry.

! 
|-
| rowspan="2"| 2017
| Yirrmal
| New Talent of the Year
| 
|rowspan="2"| 
|-
| "The Bridge"
| Song of the Year
| 
|-
| rowspan="2"| 2019
|rowspan="2"| "For Everyone"
| Film Clip of the Year
| 
|rowspan="2"| 
|-
| Song of the Year
| 
|-
| 2021
| "Ride" (Baker Boy featuring Yirrmal)
| Film Clip of the Year
| 
| 
|}

References

21st-century Australian singers
21st-century Australian male singers
Indigenous Australian musicians
Living people
1993 births